Pseudodaphnella leuckarti is a species of sea snail, a marine gastropod mollusk in the family Raphitomidae.

Description
The length of the shell attains 7 mm, its diameter 2.5 mm.

The shell has an ovately acute shape with 6-7 slightly convex whorls. The surface of this small monochrome brown snail is characterized by fairly dense, rounded longitudinal ribs, covered by regular raised striae, forming a coarse grid. The aperture is narrow and somewhat shorter than half the length of the shell. The siphonal canal is straight and short, in which the longitudinal ribs are still visible.

Distribution
This marine species occurs off Japan, Korea and the Philippines.

References

External links
 
 Gastropods.com: Pseudodaphnella leuckarti

leuckarti
Gastropods described in 1860